Goldsboro High School  is a public high school located in Wayne County, Goldsboro, North Carolina, United States. The school's mascot is the Cougar, and the school colors are navy and gold.

Notable alumni
Stanley Bryant, football player in the CFL
Travis Coleman, former NFL defensive back
Calvin Daniels, former NFL defensive linebacker
Karl Eikenberry, US Army officer and diplomat
Carl Kasell, radio personality
Clyde King, former MLB player, coach, manager, and general manager
Jerry Narron, former MLB player, manager, and now currently a coach
Dave Odom, college basketball coach
Rupert Pate, former NFL offensive lineman
Jarran Reed, NFL defensive end, 2015 CFP national champion with Alabama
Anthony Teachey, professional basketball player
David Thornton, former NFL outside linebacker with the Indianapolis Colts and Tennessee Titans
Tito Wooten, former NFL safety
Michael S. Regan, United States Environmental Protection Agency administrator nominee

Notable faculty
 Andy Griffith, actor, also taught English and Drama at Goldsboro High School for a few years

Footnotes

Public high schools in North Carolina
Schools in Wayne County, North Carolina